Serpent's Lair is a 1995 American horror film directed by Jeffrey Reiner and starring Jeff Fahey, Lisa Barbuscia, Patrick Bauchau, and Anthony Palermo. The film premiered on 19 October 1995 in the Hamptons Film Festival. The plot concentrates on a young man who is seduced by an evil succubus intent on destroying his marriage and killing him.

Plot
Newlyweds Tom and Alex move into a gloomy old apartment in Los Angeles. Soon cats start congregating around the house, one of them causes Alex to fall from the stairs, effectively sending her to the hospital and leaving Tom alone in the apartment. While she is away, Tom is visited by a strange, seductive woman, Lilith, who informs him that she has come to collect the remaining property of a former tenant, her recently deceased brother. Lilith has a special feline grace—she sneaks into the apartment and then makes aggressive moves to seduce Tom. Soon he gives into the lure of rough sex. Lilith turns out to be an insatiable lover. Tom feels so exhausted that begins seeing terrifying satanic hallucinations. When Alex finds out his affair, she leaves Tom. Lilith then moves in, and soon Tom finds himself becoming both physically drained and mentally collapsed. Gradually, he comes to realise that Lilith is, in fact, an ancient demonic succubus who seduces men, preying on their energy. Fortunately, Tom has his friends and relatives on his side who help him get rid of the demon.

Cast
Jeff Fahey as Tom Bennett
Lisa Barbuscia as Lilith Cameron
Heather Medway as Alex Bennett
Patrick Bauchau as Samuel Goddard
Anthony Palermo as Mario
Kathleen Noone as Betty
Taylor Nichols as Paul Douglas
Patrick Bauchau as Sam

Filming
The film was shot in Bucharest, Romania from 22 May to 17 June 1995.

See also
 Fatal Attraction (1987)
 Basic Instinct (1992)
 Mental illness in film

References

External links

1995 films
American horror films
1990s English-language films
Films directed by Jeffrey Reiner
1990s American films